Mavilai Ramasamy Gandhi is an Indian politician and a member of the Tamil Nadu Legislative Assembly from Nagercoil. He belongs to the Bharatiya Janata Party. He is the former vice-president of Bharatiya Janata Party, Tamil Nadu.

Private life

Gandhi was born into an agricultural family in Kanyakumari district of Tamil Nadu. He is uneducated and  never attended school due to his family's bad economic situation. Gandhi remains unmarried.

Political life 

He played a pivotal role in establishing the Hindu nationalist organisation, Bharatiya Jana Sangh in Kanyakumari. He was one of the leaders of Rashtriya Swayamsevak Sangh in Kanyakumari district.

In 1967, he was the Kanyakumari district president of Jana Sangh and in 1975 he was the Tamil Nadu state secretary of the party. He was also jailed during The Emergency. He served as Tamil Nadu state BJP vice-president from 2016 and 2020,

He unsuccessfully contested from  Colachel in 1984 and Nagercoil in 2006. Gandhi contested the 2021 Tamil Nadu Legislative Assembly election and won against DMK's former Minister N. Suresh Rajan by a margin of 11,669 votes.

Elections

Assembly Elections

Tamil Nadu Legislative Assembly

Lok Sabha Elections

Lok Sabha

References

Living people
Bharatiya Janata Party politicians from Tamil Nadu
Bharatiya Jana Sangh politicians
People from Kanyakumari district
Tamil Nadu MLAs 2021–2026
1945 births